Mitchell Dye Belisle (born November 9, 1985) is an American former professional lacrosse player for the Boston Cannons of Major League Lacrosse and former player for the Georgia Swarm in the National Lacrosse League. Belisle represented the United States in the 2014 FIL World Championship and the 2011 FIL World Indoor Championship.

Collegiate career
Belisle is a graduate of Cornell University and a member of the Cornell Athletics Hall of Fame.  As a senior he was awarded the Schmeisser Award as the nation's top defender.  He also received First-team All-American team honors, and was named to his second All-Ivy League team while leading the Big Red to the 2007 NCAA Division I Men's Lacrosse Championship Final Four.  As a junior, he was awarded Cornell's "C.F. Morse Lacrosse Scholar-Athlete of the Year Award." Belisle was elected to the Sphinx Head Society, the oldest senior society at Cornell.

Professional career
Belisle was selected by the Los Angeles Riptide as a second round selection (12th overall) in the 2007 Major League Lacrosse Collegiate Draft.

The New York Titans drafted Belisle in the First Round (13th overall) in the 2007 National Lacrosse League Entry Draft.  In Week 13 of the 2008 NLL season, Belisle scored his first and second career goals, and was awarded "Transition Player of the Week" honors.

Belisle joined the Boston Blazers for their inaugural season during the 2009 NLL season. During the season, he was named a reserve to the All-Star game.

He played in the 2012 and 2013 NLL seasons for the Minnesota Swarm. He was listed Inactive: Protected Player on December 7, 2013 and missed the 2014 NLL season. He returned to the Swarm for the 2015 and 2016 seasons.

In addition to his professional career as a player, Belisle serves as the Director of Marketing for Trilogy Lacrosse, a leading lacrosse education organization based in Brooklyn, New York.

Statistics

NLL

MLL

Awards

References

1985 births
Living people
American lacrosse players
Boston Blazers players
Cornell Big Red men's lacrosse players
Major League Lacrosse players
National Lacrosse League All-Stars
New York Titans (lacrosse) players
Minnesota Swarm players
Georgia Swarm players
Lacrosse players from Maryland
People from Severna Park, Maryland
Sportspeople from Anne Arundel County, Maryland